Co-tenidone (BAN) is a non-proprietary name used to denote a combination of atenolol and chlortalidone. Co-tenidone is used in the treatment of hypertension. The use of β-blockers in hypertension was downgraded in June 2006 in the United Kingdom to fourth-line because they perform less well than other drugs, and because atenolol, the most frequently used β-blocker, at usual doses carries an unacceptable risk of provoking type 2 diabetes.

Formulation 
Two strengths of co-tenidone are currently available in the UK:
 50 mg atenolol and 12.5 mg chlortalidone, BAN of Co-tenidone 50/12.5
 100 mg atenolol and 25 mg chlortalidone, BAN of Co-tenidone 100/25

References
 British National Formulary 54, September 2007

Footnotes

Beta blockers
Thiazides
Combination drugs